The Grande Prêmio Paraná is a Group III (formerly Group I), left-handed Brazilian flat horse race for three-year-olds and up. Run over several distances, most recently 2,000 meters ( miles). The race was not run in 2014 and 2015. Because of this, from 2016 onward it's considered a Group III race.

Results

References

External links
Jockey Club do Paraná
G. P. Paraná 2013

Horse races in Brazil